
Gmina Wilków is a rural gmina (administrative district) in Namysłów County, Opole Voivodeship, in south-western Poland.

The village of Wilków is littered with ruins of old country-houses belonging to mostly German gentry that lived in the area prior to the second world war.

Villages
Gmina Wilków contains the villages and settlements of Bukowie, Dębnik, Idzikowice, Jakubowice, Krzyków, Lubska, Młokicie, Pągów, Pielgrzymowice, Pszeniczna, Wilków and Wojciechów.

Neighbouring gminas
Gmina Wilków is bordered by the gminas of Bierutów, Dziadowa Kłoda and Namysłów.

Education
Szkola Wikow

References

Wilkow
Namysłów County